Ficalbia minima is a species complex of zoophilic mosquito belonging to the genus Ficalbia. It is found in Sri Lanka, India, Malaya, Singapore, Java, Borneo, New Guinea, and China.

References

External links
Ficalbia Theobald, 1903 - Mosquito Taxonomic Inventory
Eggs of Ficalbia minima, Theo., and Notes on Breeding Habits of three Species of Ficalbia

minima